Regulation of self-driving cars is an increasingly relevant topic in the automotive industry strongly related to the success of the actual technology. Multiple countries have passed legislation and agreed on standards for the introduction of autonomous cars.

Liability 

Self-driving car liability is a developing area of law and policy that will determine who is liable when an automated car causes physical damage to persons, or breaks road rules. When automated cars shift the control of driving from humans to automated car technology the driver will need to consent to share operational responsibility which will require a legal framework. There may be a need for existing liability laws to evolve in order to fairly identify the parties responsible for damage and injury, and to address the potential for conflicts of interest between human occupants, system operator, insurers, and the public purse.

Congestion 

Authors of the Shared Mobility Principles for Livable Cities recommend that in dense urban areas, governments require that autonomous vehicles must be operated in shared fleets rather than privately owned. They worry the much lower personal time cost of trips (people can do something else instead of driving, or send the car on its own) will create a large amount of  induced demand. They argue a per-trip charge is necessary to discourage low-value trips (such as repeatedly sending cars around town to pick up items).

Conventions on Road Traffic 
The Geneva Convention on Road Traffic subscribed to by over 101 countries worldwide, requires the driver to be 18 years old.

The 1968 Vienna Convention on Road Traffic, subscribed to by 83 countries worldwide, establishes principles to govern traffic laws. One of the fundamental principles of the convention had been the concept that a driver is always fully in control and responsible for the  behaviour of a vehicle in traffic.
In 2016, a reform of the convention has opened possibilities for automated features for ratified countries.

In January 2021, proposal of amendment to Article 1 and new Article 34 bis to the 1968 Vienna Convention on Road Traffic was transmitted to one-year period for acceptance.
By 14 January 2022, the amendment to the convention was accepted, for entry into force on 14 July 2022.

UNECE WP.29 GRVA 
In February 2018, UNECE's Inland Transport Committee (ITC) acknowledged the importance of WP.29 activities related to automated, autonomous and connected vehicles and requested WP.29 to consider establishing a dedicated Working Party. Following the request, WP.29, at its June 2018 session, decided to convert the Working Party on Brakes and Running Gear (GRRF) into a new Working Party on Automated/Autonomous and Connected Vehicles (GRVA).

In June 2020, WP.29 virtual meeting approved reports from GRVA about its fifth session on "automated/autonomous and connected vehicles" and sixth session on "cyber security and software updates".
The new Regulation on cyber security has been allocated as Regulation 155 and the new Regulation on software updates has been allocated as Regulation 156.
In this way, UN regulation on Level 3 was established.

In March 2021, the following UNECE regulations were published:
 Regulation 155: Cyber security and cyber security management system
 Regulation 156: Software update and software update management system
 Regulation 157: Automated Lane Keeping Systems (ALKS)

On 22 January 2022, these regulations come into effect in some countries.

In June 2022, the 187th session of WP.29 was held, and several amendments on GRVA regulations were agreed based on the continuous leadership of Japan in chairmanship and as proposing national body.
In case of Regulation 157 of Automated Lane Keeping System (ALKS), the speed limit of 60 km/h is to be changed to 130 km/h, and lane changing function is to be added for passenger car.

Legislation and regulation in Japan 
Japan is a non-signatory country to the Vienna Convention. In 2019, Japan amended two laws, "Road Traffic Act" and "Road Transport Vehicle Act", and they came into effect in April 2020. In the former act, Level 3 self driving cars became allowed on public roads.
In the latter act, process to designate types for safety certification on Level 3 self driving function of 
Autonomous Driving System (ADS) and the certification process for the asserted type were legally defined.
Through the amendment process, the achievements from the national project "SIP-adus" led by Cabinet Office since 2014 were fully considered and accepted.

In May 2020, "The Road Act" was also amended to include definition of automatic operation control equipment in infrastructure, and came into effect.
In July 2020, the next stage national level roadmap plan was officially issued which had considered social deployment and acceptability of Level 4.
At the end of 2020, Ministry of Land, Infrastructure, Transport and Tourism (MLIT) amended its "Safety Regulation for Road Transport Vehicle" to reflect the finalized UNECE WP.29 GRVA's regulations consistently without delay.

In April 2021, National Police Agency (NPA) published its expert committee's report of FY 2020 on summary of issues in research to realize Level 4 mobility services, including required legal amendment issues.
During the summer of 2021, Ministry of Economy, Trade and Industry (METI) prepared with MLIT to launch a project "RoAD to the L4" to cover R&D with social deployment to realize acceptable Level 4 mobility service, and updated its public information in September. As a part of this project, civil law liability problem reflecting changed roles will be clarified.

About misleading representation in marketing, Article 5 of "Act against Unjustifiable Premiums and Misleading Representations" is applied.

At the end of 2021, NPA proposed an amendment bill on "Road Traffic Act" to include approving scheme for Level 4 services.
In March 2022, the Japanese government adopted the bill to amend the act.
In April 2022, the bill was deliberated at the ordinary National Diet session and passed. Under the amended act, a license system was be introduced for operators of transport services using unmanned Level 4 vehicles, which requires no driver in the remotely monitored vehicle within a limited area. Such vehicles are expected to be used for residents in depopulated areas.
In October 2022, NPA unveiled their plan to make the amended "Road Traffic Act" into effect on April 2023, and on 20 December 2022, Japan's cabinet decided to allow Level 4 self-driving cars to be used for transit and delivery services from April 2023.

Legal status in the United States 
In the United States, a non-signatory country to the Vienna Convention, state vehicle codes generally do not envisage—but do not necessarily prohibit—highly automated vehicles . To clarify the legal status of and otherwise regulate such vehicles, several states have enacted or are considering specific laws. By 2016, seven states (Nevada, California, Florida, Michigan, Hawaii, Washington, and Tennessee), along with the District of Columbia, have enacted laws for automated vehicles. Incidents such as the first fatal accident by Tesla's Autopilot system have led to discussion about revising laws and standards for automated cars.

In 2017, the Republican-controlled House of Representatives unanimously passed "SELF DRIVE Act" which would speed the adoption of self-driving cars and bar states from setting performance standards. However, a complementary bill in the Senate, "AV START", failed to pass after Democrats raised objections that it didn't do enough to address safety and liability concerns.
A comprehensive regulatory structure has not yet emerged at either the federal or state level in the United States.

, members of the United States House of Representatives are launching a bipartisan effort to help revive legislative efforts to boost self-driving vehicles.

Federal policies 
In September 2016, the US National Economic Council and US Department of Transportation (USDOT) released the Federal Automated Vehicles Policy, which are standards that describe how automated vehicles should react if their technology fails, how to protect passenger privacy, and how riders should be protected in the event of an accident. The new federal guidelines are meant to avoid a patchwork of state laws, while avoiding being so overbearing as to stifle innovation. Since then, USDOT has released multiple updates:
 Automated Driving Systems: A Vision for Safety 2.0 (12 September 2017)
 Preparing for the Future of Transportation: Automated Vehicles 3.0 (4 October 2018)
 Ensuring American Leadership in Automated Vehicle Technologies: Automated Vehicles 4.0 (8 January 2020)

The National Highway Traffic Safety Administration (NHTSA) released for public comment the Occupant Protection for Automated Driving System on 30 March 2020, followed by the Framework for Automated Driving System Safety on 3 December 2020. Occupant Protection is intended to modernize the Federal Motor Vehicle Safety Standards considering the removal of manual controls with automated driving systems, while the Framework document is intended to provide an objective way to define and assess automated driving system competence to ensure motor vehicle safety while also remaining flexible to accommodate the development of features to improve safety.

Historically, a vehicle without driving controls such as a steering wheel, accelerator pedal, and brake pedal would not be in compliance with the Federal Motor Vehicle Safety Standards (FMVSS), the minimum safety equipment needed to legally sell a vehicle to the public. On 10 March 2022, NHTSA updated and finalized the rule on safety requirements for the Occupant Protection which now allows a vehicle without driving controls to comply with US regulations.

State policies 

, 38 states have laws or executive orders related to autonomous vehicles.

Nevada
In June 2011, the Nevada Legislature passed a law to authorize the use of automated cars. Nevada thus became the first jurisdiction in the world where automated vehicles might be legally operated on public roads. According to the law, the Nevada Department of Motor Vehicles is responsible for setting safety and performance standards and the agency is responsible for designating areas where automated cars may be tested. This legislation was supported by Google in an effort to legally conduct further testing of its Google driver-less car. The Nevada law defines an automated vehicle to be "a motor vehicle that uses artificial intelligence, sensors and global positioning system coordinates to drive itself without the active intervention of a human operator". The law also acknowledges that the operator will not need to pay attention while the car is operating itself. Google had further lobbied for an exemption from a ban on distracted driving to permit occupants to send text messages while sitting behind the wheel, but this did not become law. Furthermore, Nevada's regulations require a person behind the wheel and one in the passenger's seat during tests.

Florida
In April 2012, Florida became the second state to allow the testing of automated cars on public roads.

California
California became the third state to allow automated car testing when Governor Jerry Brown signed SB 1298 into law in September 2012 at Google Headquarters in Mountain View.

On 19 February 2016, California Assembly Bill 2866 was introduced in California. It would allow automated vehicles to operate on public roads, including those without a driver, steering wheel, accelerator pedal, or brake pedal. The bill states that the California Department of Motor Vehicles would need to comply with these regulations by 1 July 2018 for these rules to take effect. , this bill has yet to pass the house of origin. California published discussions on the proposed federal automated vehicles policy in October 2016.

In December 2016, the California Department of Motor Vehicles ordered Uber to remove its self-driving vehicles from the road in response to two red-light violations. Uber immediately blamed the violations on human error, and has suspended the drivers.

Washington, DC
In Washington, DC's district code: 

In the same district code, it is considered that:

Michigan and others
In December 2013, Michigan became the fourth state to allow testing of driver-less cars on public roads. In July 2014, the city of Coeur d'Alene, Idaho adopted a robotics ordinance that includes provisions to allow for self-driving cars.

Legislation in the United Kingdom 
In 2013, the government of the United Kingdom permitted the testing of automated cars on public roads. Before this, all testing of robotic vehicles in the UK had been conducted on private property.

In July 2018, "The Automated and Electric Vehicles Act 2018" received royal assent.

In March 2019, the UK became a signatory country to the Vienna Convention.

In 2021, the UK worked on a bill to allow self-driving automated lane keeping systems (ALKS) up to 37 mph (or 60 km/h) after a mixed reaction of experts during the consultation launched in summer 2020. This system would be allowed to give back control to the driver when "unplanned events" such as road construction or inclement weather occurs. The Centre for Connected and Autonomous Vehicles (CCAV) has asked the Law Commission of England and Wales and the Scottish Law Commission to undertake a far-reaching review of the legal framework for "automated" vehicles, and their use as part of public transport networks and on-demand passenger services. The teams developed policy and the full analysis report was published in January 2022.

About misleading representation in marketing, the Society of Motor Manufacturers and Traders (SMMT) published guiding principles as followings:
 An automated driving feature must be described sufficiently clearly so as not to mislead, including setting out the circumstances in which that feature can function.
 An automated driving feature must be described sufficiently clearly so that it is distinguished from an assisted driving feature.
 Where both automated driving and assisted driving features are described, they must be clearly distinguished from each other.
 An assisted driving feature should not be described in a way that could convey the impression that it is an automated driving feature.
 The name of an automated or assisted driving feature must not mislead by conveying that it is the other – ancillary words may be necessary to avoid confusion – for example for an assisted driving feature, by making it clear that the driver must be in control at all times.

In April 2022, UK government confirmed planned changes to "The Highway Code", responding to a public consultation. The changes will clarify drivers' responsibilities in self-driving vehicles, including when a driver must be ready to take back control.
And in August 2022, UK government unveiled a plan to roll out self-driving vehicles on UK roads.

Legislation in Europe 
EU
In November 2019, Regulation (EU) 2019/2144 of the European Parliament and of the Council on motor vehicle type approval requirements defined specific requirements relating to automated vehicles and fully automated vehicles. This law is applicable from 2022 and is based on uniform procedures and technical specifications for the systems and other items.

In April 2022, EU released a draft version of its legislation for vehicles with automated driving systems (ADS).

In July 2022, the new "Vehicle General Safety Regulation" come into effect which establishes the legal framework for the approval of automated and fully driverless vehicles (Level 3 and above) in the EU. 
And the EU introduced regulations which require all new cars from 6 July 2022 to be fitted with intelligent speed assistance (ISA) (Level 2).

EU Commission delegated regulation contains specific requirements for specific vehicles with regulatory differences between:
 Fully automated vehicles of categories N1, N2 and N3 without driver seat and without occupants
 Fully automated vehicles of categories N1, N2, N3, M1, M2, M3 without driver seat, with occupants
 Dual mode vehicles: vehicles with a driver seat designed and constructed to be driven by the driver in the “manual driving mode” and to be driven by the automated driving system (ADS) without any driver supervision in the “fully automated driving mode”

France
France is a signatory country to the Vienna Convention.
In 2014, the government of France announced that testing of automated cars on public roads would be allowed in 2015. 2000 km of road would be opened through the national territory, especially in Bordeaux, in Isère, Île-de-France and Strasbourg. At the 2015 ITS World Congress, a conference dedicated to intelligent transport systems, the very first demonstration of automated vehicles on open road in France was carried out in Bordeaux in early October 2015.

In May 2018, the government published the first version of the French strategy for the development of automated road mobility to set up the legislative framework, and it brought a result as "The Mobility Orientation Law" in December 2019.

In December 2020, the government updated the strategy to make France the preferred location in Europe for the deployment of automated road mobility services.

The legislative and regulatory framework for the deployment of automated vehicles and transport systems was established through an ordinance in April 2021 and a following decree in June 2021.
The legislative and regulatory framework for the operation of automated vehicles resulting from article 31 of "the Mobility Orientation Law" is scheduled to be finalized in Q1 of 2022.

Germany
Germany is a signatory country to the Vienna Convention.
In July 2021, the "Federal Act Amending the Road Traffic Act and the Compulsory Insurance Act" came into effect.
The Act allows motor vehicles with autonomous driving capabilities, meaning vehicles that can perform driving tasks independently without a person driving, in specified operating areas on public roads. Provisions about autonomous driving in appropriate operating areas correspond to Level 4. Moreover, the new German legislation has major implications for dilemmatic situations. This includes for example the non-discrimination principle that applies to unavoidable crash situations. Moreover, the act elaborates on the technical requirements of autonomous vehicles, including a software system that can operate without permanent supervision of the technical oversight or driver, contains an accident mitigation and reduction system and can initiate a “minimal-risk state.”

In February 2022, the Federal Ministry for Digital and Transport (BMDV) submitted the "Ordinance on the Approval and Operation of Motor Vehicles with Autonomous Driving Functions in Specified Operating Areas - Autonomous Vehicles Approval and Operation Ordinance (AFGBV)" to the German Bundesrat for approval.

Legislation in North America 

Canada
Canada is a non-signatory country to the Vienna Convention.
At the federal level, "The Motor Vehicle Safety Act" regulates about motor vehicles which was last amended in February 2020.

In August 2021, Transport Canada released the "Guidelines for Testing Automated Driving Systems in Canada" Version 2.0.

Legislation in Asia 
China
For historical reason, China is not a signatory country to 1949 Geneva Convention,
although it is a signatory country to 1968 Vienna Convention.
Legislations are conducted at National People's Congress and its Standing Committee which are under control of Chinese Communist Party.

In 2018, China introduced testing regulations to regulate autonomous cars, for conditional automation, high-level automation and full automation (roughly corresponding to Level 3, Level 4 and Level 5).
The rules lay out requirements that vehicles must first be tested in non-public zones, that road tests can only be on designated streets and that a qualified person must always sit in the driver's position, ready to take over control.

In February 2020, eleven constituent departments, represented by National Development and Reform Commission (NDRC), jointly issued the "Strategy for Innovation and Development of Intelligent Vehicles" which describes about roadmap plan until 2025. This plan states about the need to revise the "Road Traffic Safety Law", and surveying and mapping law for intelligent vehicles.

In March 2020, Ministry of Industry and Information Technology (MIIT) published draft GB/T on 6-levels classification framework for driving automation which is basically corresponding to SEA levels.
And in April 2020, MIIT released about the goal of the year which is set to complete the formulation of framework for driving-assist functions and low-level autonomous driving (Level 3).
In January 2021, MIIT planned to add highways to the list of roads where provincial and city-level authorities can authorize automated cars.

In March 2021, Ministry of Public Security (MPS) published draft proposed amendments on the "Road Traffic Safety Law".
In August 2021, The Cyberspace Administration of China (CAC) and MIIT issued "the Provisions on Management of Automotive Data Security (Trial)".
In September 2021, "Data Security Law" came into effect, which broadly expands the extraterritorial reach of China's existing data rules.

In February 2022, MIIT issued the second draft of the "Administrative Measures for Data Security in the Industry and Information Technology Fields".
And in March 2022, MIIT issued "the Guidelines for the Construction of the Internet of Vehicles Cybersecurity and Data Security Standard System".

Legislation in Oceania 
Australia
Australia is a non-signatory country to the Vienna Convention. 
National Transport Commission (NTC) is in charge of reforming current laws with still achieving national level consistency.
In February 2022, NTC published a policy paper to present proposals on the end-to-end regulatory framework for the commercial deployment of automated
vehicles.

Department of Infrastructure, Transport, Regional Development and Communications (DITRDC) is in charge of developing their policies and bills on first supply and in-service automated vehicle law.

New Zealand
New Zealand is a non-signatory country to the Vienna Convention.
New Zealand legislation does not specifically require a driver to be present for a vehicle to be legally operated on a public road. However, most regulations and relevant international frameworks strongly imply the presence of a driver in the vehicle given that ‘automation’ was not a consideration at the time of drafting the legislation.

, Ministry of Transport is working on "Autonomous Vehicles Work Programme" with "Long-term Insights Briefing (LTIB)" which will include legislation issues.

Legislation in Middle East 
Israel
Israelis a signatory country to the Vienna Convention.
, Israel Innovation Authority (OCS) is working on forming regulatory framework for trials and use of autonomous vehicles with Ministry of Transport and Road Safety (MOT) and Ministry of Justice.

In March 2022, the Knesset passed legislation that will allow companies to pilot autonomous shared transportation with passengers in the vehicle but without a safety driver on Israeli roads. The legislation allows companies and vehicle operators to obtain special licenses from MOT and to conduct trials with autonomous cars including for the purpose of transporting paying passengers and where an independent driving system replaces the driver.

References

Regulation of robots